Puss in Boots is an action game based on the film of the same name. It was developed by Blitz Games, and released by THQ for Xbox 360, PlayStation 3, Wii and Nintendo DS. It features support for Kinect and PlayStation Move on the respective platforms. It was released on October 25, 2011 in North America and on December 2, 2011 in Europe.

Gameplay 

The console versions of the game provide players an opportunity to engage in frantic swordplay action as Puss, utilizing motion controls, mandatory for the Wii and Xbox 360 versions and optional for the PS3 version, for attack actions.  The non-Nintendo versions also support multiplayer.  The Nintendo DS version, which is a rhythm-action game, also requires motion controls via stylus and touch screen.

Synopsis
In the years before meeting Shrek and Donkey in Shrek 2, Puss in Boots must clear his name from all charges against him that has made him a wanted fugitive. While Puss is trying to steal magic beans from the infamous criminals Jack and Jill, the hero crosses paths with his female counterpart, Kitty Softpaws, who leads him to his old friend turned enemy, Humpty Dumpty. Memories of friendship and betrayal enlarges Puss' doubt, but he eventually agrees to help the egg get the magic beans. Together, the three of them plan to steal the magic beans, travel to the Giant's castle, steal the golden goose, and clear Puss' name.

Plot
The game plot follows the storyline of the 2011 Puss in Boots film:

Puss in Boots (Antonio Banderas) is a talking cat named for his wearing boots and is a fugitive on the run from the law, looking to restore his lost honor. He learns that the outlaw couple Jack and Jill (Billy Bob Thornton and Amy Sedaris) have the magic beans he's been looking for most of his life, beans that can lead him to a giant's castle holding valuable golden goose eggs. When Puss tries to steal them from the outlaws' room, female cat Kitty Softpaws (Salma Hayek) interrupts, and both fail. Kitty is allied with Humpty Alexander Dumpty (Zach Galifianakis), a talking egg and Puss' long-estranged childhood friend from the orphanage where he was raised. Puss tells Kitty his origin story and of his feelings of betrayal for a youthful misadventure when Humpty tricked Puss into helping commit a bank robbery; Puss has been on the run since. Humpty convinces Puss to join them in finding the beans and retrieving the golden eggs.

The trio steals the beans from Jack and Jill and plant them in the desert. Puss and Kitty's relationship becomes romantic. The trio ride the beanstalk into the clouds to find the castle of the late giant, while avoiding the Great Terror who guards the Golden Goose. When they realize the golden eggs are too heavy to carry, they steal the Goose, which is just a gosling, and escape the castle. While celebrating their victory, the group is ambushed by Jack and Jill, who knock Puss unconscious.

When Puss wakes up, he tracks Jack and Jill to his old hometown where he learns the entire heist was a plot by Humpty to lure him home to be captured, as revenge for abandoning him on the bridge to the authorities when Humpty's youthful heist went bad. Jack, Jill, and Kitty were involved in the con. After pleas from his adoptive mother, Puss turns himself in to the guards while Humpty donates many golden eggs to the town and becomes a hero.

While in prison, Puss meets Andy Beanstalk, the original Jack, from "Jack and the Beanstalk" (Mike Mitchell), who warns him that the Great Terror is in fact the Goose's mother, and it will stop at nothing to get its child back. A repentant Kitty helps Puss break out of prison and tells him she loves him. Puss tracks down Humpty, who wants the Great Terror to demolish the town. Puss convinces Humpty to help him fight off the Great Terror, saying he knows Humpty is a good person at heart. The Great Terror, a giant goose, arrives. Using the Goose as bait, Puss and Humpty lure the Great Terror out of the town, but Humpty and the Goose are knocked off the same bridge, where Puss left Humpty, with him holding onto them. Humpty knows Puss cannot hold both of them, so he lets go, sacrificing himself to save the Goose and the town. Humpty's shell cracks open to reveal he was a golden egg on the inside. The Great Terror then takes the baby Goose and Humpty back to the giant's castle.

Puss' efforts to save the town make him a hero among the townspeople. In the epilogue, Jack and Jill are recovering from their injuries after being crushed by the Great Terror, Humpty is shown once again in his regular egg form, wearing a golden egg suit, as he rides the Great Terror into the clouds, and Puss and Kitty finally kiss.

Spin-off mobile game
A mobile spin-off, Fruit Ninja: Puss in Boots, was released on October 20, 2011, on the iOS App Store, and was released for Android devices on November 28, 2011, on the Amazon Appstore, as part of Halfbrick Studios' Fruit Ninja series and game franchise.

Reception

In general the game was received well. With a rating of 7 out of 10 on trustedreviews.com. Official Xbox Magazine gave the game a rating of 8 out of 10, saying that the game "constantly surprises with a steady amount of variety and silly fun" and had "responsive controls and some inventive gameplay for Kinect users".

References

External links
 Official website

2011 video games
Action video games
Kinect games
Nintendo DS games
PlayStation 3 games
PlayStation Move-compatible games
Shrek video games
Video games about cats
Video games developed in the United Kingdom
Video games set in castles
Wii games
Xbox 360 games
THQ games
Multiplayer and single-player video games
Blitz Games Studios games
ImaginEngine games